Isaac Mervyn Jaffey, known during his cricket career as Mervyn Jaffey and later known as Mervyn Jeffries (born 9 September 1929 in  Dublin, Republic of Ireland) was an Irish former cricketer. A right-handed batsman and wicket-keeper, he played twice for the Ireland cricket team in 1953 including one first-class match.

Biography

Considered an outstanding wicket-keeper at school, Jaffey went on to Dublin University and broke into the cricket team in his first year and was captain of the team in 1952. He made his debut for the Ireland team against the MCC in June 1953 at Lord's. He did not bat in the first innings and scored just one run in the second, his only run for Ireland. His final match was against Scotland in Belfast, which was his only first-class appearance. The match was ruined by rain, with only the Scottish first innings being completed.

After a two match international career that saw him take one catch and three stumpings he found that the demands of his career as a medical doctor prevented him from playing more serious cricket, and he later emigrated to the U.S. to further his career. He later changed his name to Mervyn Jeffries.

References

1929 births
2014 deaths
Irish cricketers
Cricketers from County Dublin
People educated at Wesley College, Dublin
Dublin University cricketers
Wicket-keepers